Bindon Blood Stoney FRS (13 June 1828, Oakley Park, County Offaly – 5 May 1909, Dublin) was an Irish engineer who also made some significant contributions to astronomy.

Family
A son of George Stoney (1792–) and Anne Blood (1801–1883), Stoney married Susannah Frances Walker on 7 October 1879; they had four children. He is buried in Mount Jerome cemetery.

His brother was the physicist George Johnstone Stoney known for coining the term electron for the fundamental unit of electricity. He was also the uncle of another Irish physicist George Francis FitzGerald, the son of his sister Anne Frances. His nieces were Edith Anne Stoney, a pioneer medical physicist, and Florence Stoney, the first female radiologist in the United Kingdom; both served in hospitals near the front line during World War I.

Astronomy
In 1850-52, prior to beginning his engineering work, Stoney assisted William Parsons, 3rd Earl of Rosse at Parsonstown. There he accurately mapped the spiral form of the Andromeda Galaxy and observed 105 NGC objects and 8 IC objects. 91 NGC objects and all IC objects were new.

Engineering career

Bindon’s career in engineering commenced when he worked on surveys for the Aranjuez to Almansa railway in Spain from 1852-3. Upon returning to Ireland in 1854, he was appointed as resident engineer under James Barton on the Boyne railway viaduct until its completion in 1855. This viaduct claimed to have the longest span in the world and had the world’s longest girders at the time.

Bindon’s groundbreaking work building a metal bridge with a span of such dimensions using shock-absorbent wrought-iron latticed bars instead of a continuity of plate with Barton was possibly the first of its kind. It was the basis for his later two-volume publication The theory of strains in girders and similar structures, with observations on the strength and other properties of materials (1866), nicknamed ‘Stoney on strains’ and reproduced in two further editions.

Bindon became an associate of the Institution of Civil Engineers (ICE) in January 1858 and a full member in November 1863.

In 1856, Bindon was appointed as assistant engineer to George Halpin Junior at the Ballast Board on Westmoreland Street and in 1859 he was appointed as Executive Engineer. Stoney was ambitious and an engineering innovator who had come up with a cheap way to develop the Dublin Port – something appreciated by the board but they also did not want to upset Halpin. When Halpin retired, Stoney became the new inspector of works and in 1868, he became the first chief engineer of the newly constituted Dublin Port and Docks Board.

Bindon designed a large dredging plant and rebuilt nearly 7,000ft of quay walls along both north and south banks of the River Liffey, replacing the tidal berths by deep water berths. Additionally, the northern quays were lengthened eastwards and the formation of Alexandra Basin begun in 1871 and was partially completed by 1885. In addition to harbour works, Stoney was in charge of the design and construction of two major bridges that crossed the River Liffey. In 1872–5 he largely rebuilt Essex Bridge, designed in the 1750s by George Semple to his own flamboyant design; it was renamed Grattan Bridge after Henry Grattan.  In 1877–80 he redesigned the 1790s Carlisle Bridge of James Gandon, renamed O'Connell Bridge after Daniel O'Connell, to provide a crossing linking Sackville (later O'Connell) Street with the converging streets to the south. He built a new iron swing bridge in 1877–9, just west of the Custom House named Beresford Bridge.

He invented a diving bell, and means to use precast concrete. Towards the end of Bindon's career, he erected the North Bull lighthouse (1877–80) to replace the inadequate light on the Bull Wall marking the northern side of the Dublin port channel entrance opposite Poolbeg lighthouse before finally retiring in 1898.

Honours 
Bindon was admitted to the Royal Irish Academy in 1857. Bindon was given an honorary degree by University College Dublin in recognition of his achievements and was later elected President of the Institution of Civil Engineers of Ireland in 1871. In 1874, he was awarded the Telford medal and Telford premium of the Institution of Civil Engineers for a paper documenting his work on the northern quays. Stoney was elected Fellow of the Royal Society on 2 June 1881.

Stoney Road in East Wall is named after Stoney.

Sources
Ronald C. Cox, Bindon Blood Stoney: biography of a port engineer, Irish Engineering Publications, 1990, .

References

External links
Old Diving Bell – Designed By Bindon Blood Stoney
List of astronomical observations made by Stoney at Parsonstown

1828 births
1909 deaths
People from County Offaly
Irish engineers
Fellows of the Royal Society
Burials at Mount Jerome Cemetery and Crematorium
Irish astronomers
Members of the Royal Irish Academy